This is a list of all of the visitors to the International Space Station (ISS), including long-term crew, short-term visitors, and space tourists, in alphabetical order. ISS crew names are in bold. The suffix (twice, three times, ...) refers to the individual's number of spaceflights to the ISS, not the total number of spaceflights. Entries without a flag symbol indicate that the individual was an American citizen at launch. Entries without a female symbol are men.

Statistics 
, 244 individuals have made 403 spaceflights to the ISS, including the seven people currently at the ISS (Expedition 65). Two people have made five spaceflights to the ISS, while five people have made four, 36 people made three and 84 people made two. Note that this list assigns individuals with dual citizenship to their country of primary residence at time of launch (for example, the Iranian-American space tourist Anousheh Ansari is only listed under the United States).

All private space travel is aboard the Russian Soyuz spacecraft. When only two crew members are required in the three-seat Soyuz, and additional cargo is not sent, the additional seat is sold to the general public through Space Adventures. Private travelers remain on the ISS during handover from one expedition crew to the next, generally a week or two. The NASA Space Shuttle carried seven crew members, and the longest docking with the ISS was 11 days. Many visitors to the ISS were accommodated for short periods during NASA shuttle dockings. NASA stated it was "not interested" in private spaceflight from the beginning of the ISS and has not changed its position.

Long-term ISS crew, by nationality

All visitors, by nationality

All visitors, by agency

A

 Joe Acaba (three times) 
 Viktor Afanasyev 
 Aydyn Aimbetov  
 Scott D. Altman
  Clayton C. Anderson (twice) 
 Anousheh Ansari   /  (tourist) 
 Dominic A. Antonelli  (twice) 
 Lee J. Archambault (twice) 
 Richard R. Arnold 
  Oleg Artemyev  (three times)
 Jeffrey S. Ashby (twice)

B
  Michael R. Barratt (twice)
 Kayla Barron 
 Daniel T. Barry (twice) 
 Yuri Baturin  
 Robert L. Behnken (three times)
 Michael J. Bloomfield (twice) 
 Eric A. Boe (twice) 
  Andrei Borisenko  (twice)
 Stephen G. Bowen (four times) (currently onboard) 
  Kenneth D. Bowersox 
  Randolph J. Bresnik (twice) 
  Nikolai Budarin  
  Daniel C. Burbank (three times)
  Daniel W. Bursch

C
 Robert D. Cabana 
  Tracy E. Caldwell-Dyson  (twice) 
 Charles J. Camarda 
 Josh A. Cassada
 Christopher J. Cassidy (twice)
  Gregory E. Chamitoff (twice) 
 Franklin R. Chang-Diaz  / 
 Raja Chari
  Leroy Chiao (twice) 
  Catherine G. Coleman  
 Eileen M. Collins  
  Larry Connor (tourist)
 Kenneth D. Cockrell (twice) 
  Timothy J. Creamer 
 Samantha Cristoforetti   (twice)
  Frank L. Culbertson 
 Robert L. Curbeam (twice) 
 Nancy J. Currie

D
  Frank De Winne  (twice) 
  Vladimir Dezhurov  
 Takao Doi  
 Benjamin A. Drew (twice) 
 Pyotr Dubrov 
 Brian Duffy 
 Pedro Duque  
 James P. Dutton

E
  Léopold Eyharts

F
Andrey Fedyaev  (currently onboard)
 Christopher J. Ferguson (three times) 
 Andrew J. Feustel 
  Michael Fincke (three times) 
  Jack D. Fischer  
  Michael Foale / 
  Kevin A. Ford (twice) 
 Michael J. Foreman (twice) 
 Patrick G. Forrester (three times) 
  Michael E. Fossum (three times) 
 Stephen N. Frick (twice) 
 Christer Fuglesang  (twice) 
  Satoshi Furukawa

G
  Ronald J. Garan (twice)
 Marc Garneau  
 Richard A. Garriott (tourist) 
 Michael L. Gernhardt 
  Alexander Gerst  (twice)
  Yuri Gidzenko  (twice) 
 Victor J. Glover
 Linda M. Godwin  
 Michael T. Good 
 Umberto Guidoni

H
  Chris Hadfield  (twice) 
 Nick Hague
 Claudie Haigneré   
 James D. Halsell 
 Kenneth Ham (twice) 
  Susan Helms  (twice) 
 José M. Hernández 
 John Herrington 
 Joan Higginbotham  
Robert Hines
 Yozo Hirano  (tourist) 
 Kathryn P. Hire  
 Charles O. Hobaugh (three times) 
 Warren Hoburg (currently onboard)
  Michael S. Hopkins (twice) 
 Scott J. Horowitz (twice) 
  Akihiko Hoshide  (twice)
 Douglas G. Hurley (three times)
 Rick Husband

I
 Marsha S. Ivins  
  Anatoli Ivanishin  (three times)

J
 Tamara E. Jernigan  
 Brent W. Jett (twice) 
 Gregory H. Johnson (twice) 
 Thomas D. Jones

K
  Aleksandr Kaleri  (twice) 
 Janet L. Kavandi  
 James M. Kelly (twice) 
 Mark E. Kelly (four times) 
  Scott J. Kelly (three times)
 Nicole Aunapu Mann  
  Robert S. Kimbrough (twice)
   Christina Koch  
  Dmitri Kondratyev  
  Oleg Kononenko  (four times) 
  Timothy L. Kopra (twice) 
  Mikhail Korniyenko  (twice) 
  Sergey Korsakov 
  Valery Korzun  
  Oleg Kotov  (three times) 
 Konstantin Kozeyev  
  Sergei Krikalev  (three times) 
  Sergey Kud-Sverchkov 
  André Kuipers  (twice)

L
 Guy Laliberté  (tourist) 
 Wendy B. Lawrence 
  Kjell Lindgren (twice)
 Steven W. Lindsey (three times) 
 Richard M. Linnehan 
 Paul S. Lockhart (twice) 
  Yuri Lonchakov  (three times) 
  Michael E. Lopez-Alegria (four times) 
 Stanley G. Love 
  Edward T. Lu (twice)

M
 Steve MacLean  
 Yusaku Maezawa  (tourist)
  Sandra H. Magnus  (three times) 
  Yuri Malenchenko  (five times) 
  Hazza Al Mansouri 
  Nicole Aunapu Mann
  Thomas H. Marshburn (three times)
  Richard A. Mastracchio (four times)
  Denis Matveev 
 Matthias Maurer  
  Megan McArthur  
  William S. McArthur (twice) 
  Anne McClain 
 Pamela A. Melroy  (three times) 
 Leland D. Melvin (twice) 
 Dorothy M. Metcalf-Lindenburger  
  Aleksandr Misurkin  (three times)
 Andreas Mogensen 
 Lee M. E. Morin
 Barbara R. Morgan  
 Boris Morukov  
 Talgat Musabayev  flew in 2001 as a Russian citizen, became citizen of Kazakhstan in 2007

N
  Paolo Nespoli  (three times)  
 James H. Newman 
Sultan Al Neyadi   (Currently Onboard)
  Soichi Noguchi  (three times)
 Carlos I. Noriega 
  Oleg Novitskiy  (twice) 
 Lisa M. Nowak  
  Karen L. Nyberg  (twice)

O
 Ellen L. Ochoa  (twice) 
 William A. Oefelein 
 John D. Olivas (twice)
  Takuya Onishi  
  Yuri Onufrienko  
 Gregory H. Olsen (tourist)
 Aleksey Ovchinin

P
  Gennady Padalka  (four times) 
 Scott E. Parazynski (twice) 
  Luca Parmitano  (twice)
  Mark Pathy  (tourist)
 Nicholas J.M. Patrick (twice) 
 Julie Payette   (twice) 
  Timothy Peake  
 Yulia Peresild  (tourist)
 Philippe Perrin 
Dmitry Petelin  (currently onboard)
  Thomas Pesquet  (twice) 
  Donald R. Pettit (three times) 
  John L. Phillips (three times) 
 Alan G. Poindexter (twice) 
 Mark L. Polansky (three times) 
 Marcos Pontes  
 Dominic L. Pudwill Gorie (twice)
Sergey Prokopyev   (twice) (currently onboard)

Q

R
James F. Reilly (twice) 
  Garrett E. Reisman (twice) 
  Thomas Reiter  
  Sergei Revin  
 Paul W. Richards 
 Stephen K. Robinson (twice) 
  Roman Romanenko  (twice) 
 Kent V. Rominger (twice) 
 Jerry L. Ross (twice)
  Kathleen Rubins  (twice) 
Francisco Rubio (currently onboard)
  Sergey Ryazansky  (twice)  
 Sergei Nikolayevich Ryzhikov  (twice)

S
 David Saint-Jacques
 Aleksandr Samokutyayev  (twice) 
 Robert L. Satcher
 Yelena Serova   
 Hans Schlegel  
 Piers J. Sellers (three times) 
 Yuri Shargin  
 Salizhan Sharipov  
 William M. Shepherd 
 Klim Shipenko  (tourist)
 Anton Shkaplerov  (four times) 
 Mark Shuttleworth  (tourist) 
 Sheikh Muszaphar Shukor  
 Charles Simonyi  /  (tourist) (twice) 
 Oleg Skripochka  (three times) 
 Aleksandr Skvortsov  (three times)
 Steven L. Smith 

 Heidemarie M. Stefanyshyn-Piper  (twice) 
 Eytan Stibbe  
 Nicole P. Stott  (twice) 
 Frederick W. Sturckow (four times) 
 Maksim Surayev  (twice)
 Steven R. Swanson (three times)

T
  Daniel M. Tani (twice) 
 Joseph R. Tanner (twice) 
  Evgeny Tarelkin  
 Andrew S.W. Thomas / (twice) 
  Robert Thirsk  
  Scott Tingle
Dennis Tito (tourist)
  Valery Tokarev  (twice) 
  Sergei Treshchev  
  Mikhail Tyurin  (three times)

U
  Yury Usachev  (twice)

V
 Ivan Vagner 
 Mark T. Vande Hei (twice)
  Pavel Vinogradov  (twice)
  Terry W. Virts (twice) 
 Roberto Vittori  (three times) 
  Sergey Volkov  (three times) 
  James S. Voss (twice)

W
  Koichi Wakata  (five times) 
 Rex J. Walheim (three times) 
  Shannon Walker  (twice)
  Carl E. Walz
  Jessica Watkins  
 Mary E. Weber  
 James D. Wetherbee (twice) 
  Douglas H. Wheelock (twice) 
  Peggy A. Whitson  (three times)  
 Terrence W. Wilcutt 
 Dafydd Williams  
  Jeffrey N. Williams (four times) 
  Sunita L. Williams  (twice) 
  Barry E. Wilmore (twice) 
 Stephanie D. Wilson  (three times) 
 Gregory R. Wiseman 
 Peter J.K. Wisoff 
 David A. Wolf (twice)

X

Y
 Naoko Yamazaki   
 Yi So-Yeon  
  Kimiya Yui  
  Fyodor Yurchikhin  (five times)

Z
 Sergei Zalyotin  
 George D. Zamka /(twice)

See also
 List of International Space Station crew
 List of astronauts by name

References

External links
NASA Shuttle mission history
NASA Major ISS events
ESA ISS page

International Space Station visitors
International Space Station visitors